Brian Harrison may refer to:

 Brian Harrison (Conservative politician) (1921–2011), Australian-born British Conservative politician
 Brian Harrison (historian) (born 1937), editor of Oxford Dictionary of National Biography and professor
 Brian Harrison (Labour politician), councillor in Old Moat, Manchester, England
 Brian Harrison (Texas politician) (born c. 1983), political appointee in G. W. Bush and Trump administrations
 Brian Harrison (theologian) (born 1945), Australian-born Roman Catholic priest and theologian